Chitrangada Mori was a ruler from the Mori  clan who laid the foundation of the fort of Chittorgarh, which is the largest fort in India. 

Chitrang had his capital at Chittorgarh. He reigned in the 8th century AD, and the ruins of his palace still are present today. Chittorgarh was then known as Chitrakot, which changed to Chittorgarh in colloquial language.
Chitrangada Mori was possibly succeeded by Bappa Rawal , The Rajput ruler of Guhila dynasty after several conflicts with Arabs

See also
Chittorgarh
Guhila dynasty
Sisodias of Mewar
Mori Rajputs

References

History of Rajasthan
Chittorgarh district